I-15 Express Lanes may refer to:
I-15 Express Lanes (Las Vegas)
Express Lanes (Salt Lake City)
I-15 Express Lanes (San Diego)